Pil Gushkan (also Romanized as Pīl Gūshkān; also known as Pīl Kūshkān) is a village in Poshtkuh Rural District, in the Central District of Khash County, Sistan and Baluchestan Province, Iran. At the 2006 census, its population was 227, in 44 families.

References 

Populated places in Khash County